Bareiro is a surname. Notable people with the surname include:

 Adam Bareiro (born 1996), Paraguayan footballer
 Antonio Bareiro, Paraguayan footballer
 Cándido Bareiro (1833–1880), President of Paraguay
 Fredy Bareiro (born 1982), Paraguayan footballer
 Nery Bareiro (born 1988), Paraguayan footballer